Kūlgrinda is a folk music group from Vilnius, Lithuania, established in 1989 by Inija and Jonas Trinkūnas. The group is connected to the Lithuanian neopagan movement Romuva and often performs as a part of the movement's ceremonies.

History
The band was founded in 1989 by Jonas Trinkūnas and his wife Inija Trinkūnienė who also were the leaders of the modern Pagan movement Romuva. The band has from the start functioned as the musical expression of this movement. Some of the recorded material has functioned as "musical scriptures" for the Romuva members and the band has regularly participated as an integral part of the movement's events. On the website of Romuva, Kūlgrinda is described as a "ritual folklore group".

The band owes its name to kūlgrinda – a secret Samogitian underwater causeway. Kūlgrinda's music typically consists of straightforward folk music performances with little studio enhancement and a focus on the vocal performances. It has specialised on sutartinės, a traditional form of polyphonic song-chant where several vocalists perform interlocking melodies that through rhythmic repetition create a pattern of musical expression. The musicologist Daiva Račiūnaitė-Vyčinienė has compared this technique to the weaving of a multicoloured cloth.

The band has collaborated with other artists such as the electronic musician Donis, the singer Rasa Serra and the heavy metal band Ugnėlakis. The latter collaboration resulted in the forming of the folk rock group Žalvarinis.

Discography

Kulgrinda albums were initially released by Dangus Records. Later the band signed with Aurea Studija.

1996: Kūlgrinda – cassette
2002: Ugnėlakis su Kūlgrinda – with Ugnėlakis
2002: Ugnies Apeigos ("Rite of Fire")
2003: Sotvaras  – with Donis
2003: Perkūno Giesmės ("Hymns of Perkūnas")
2005: Prūsų Giesmės ("Prussian Hymns", sung in the extinct Old Prussian language)
2007: Giesmės Saulei ("Hymns of the Sun")
2009: Giesmės Valdovui Gediminui ("Hymns to King Gediminas")
2013: Giesmės Žemynai ("Hymns to Žemyna")  – with Donis
2014: Laimos Giesmės ("The Hymns of Laima")
2018: Giesmės Austėjai ("Hymns to Austėja")

See also
Neopagan music

References

External links

Official website 

Modern paganism in Lithuania
Lithuanian folk music groups
Modern pagan musical groups
Baltic modern paganism
Musical groups established in 1989